Tomarza, formerly known as Dumarza (Armenian: Դումարզա), is a city of Kayseri Province in the Central Anatolia region of Turkey. The mayor is Davut Şahin (AKP).

Toros Madaghjian (1890-1989)  wrote the history of Tomarza in a book called  "Memories of Tomarza".  It was written in Armenian and first published in 1959.  It was later translated into English and published in 2015 on Amazon.  Toros survived the Armenian Genocide and settled in Racine, Wisconsin where many of his descendants now live.  He first came to Racine in 1910, but returned to Tomarza to get a bride in 1921.  His parents, brother and 2 sisters were all massacred in 1915.  He was a founding member of St. Mesrob Armenian church in Racine as well as the founder of the first Armenian Sunday school in America.  He served as the Superintendent from 1925 to 1945 when his eldest son Jack Madaghjian (1924-2017) took over and eventually Sam Kaprelian (1925-2012) who served as recently as 1980.

Tomarza is a famous city for its pumpkin seeds production. According to Gida Tarim, Tomarza is one of the important pumpkin seed production centers in Turkey. While 60 percent of the snack pumpkin seeds produced in Turkey are met by Kayseri, 25 percent of the production in Kayseri comes from the city of Tomarza. Pumpkin seeds will be planted on 40 thousand acres of land. In 2020, 5 thousand 500 tons of harvest were obtained from the pumpkin seeds for snacks planted on 40 thousand acres of land in Tomarza. Other important activities are potato production, and sheep, goat and cattle-raising.

Climate
Tomarza has a warm summer continental climate (Dfb) with cold winters and very warm, dry summers with cool nights. Rainfall occurs mostly during the spring and early summer.

References

Famous People

Toros Madaghjian (1890-1989)

Osman Koç (Politician from Republican People's Party)

External links
Official website of the Municipality of Tomarza
Official website of the Governor of Tomarza

Populated places in Kayseri Province
Districts of Kayseri Province
Towns in Turkey